Archibius was the name of several people of classical antiquity:
Archibius of Alexandria, grammarian who wrote about the epigrams of Callimachus
Archibius (surgeon), a Greek surgeon of the 1st century CE

See also
Archebius (1st century BCE), an Indo-Greek king who ruled in the area of Taxila, Pakistan
Archibus, an Integrated Workplace Management System